Baron Gyula Wlassics de Zalánkemén (17 March 1852 – 30 March 1937) was a Hungarian politician, who served as Minister of Religion and Education between 1895 and 1903.

Description
In December 1895 Wlassics passed a law that allowed women, among whom Sarolta Steinberger, to attend Eötvös Loránd University in Budapest to study medicine.

Wlassics favoured the free religious practice.  He initiated the establishing of the museums' and the libraries' uniform organization with a national level. King Franz Joseph I awarded him with Iron Crown of Austria. He served as Speaker of the House of Magnates in 1918 and from 1927 to 1935. Wlassics was member of the Hungarian Academy of Sciences.

References

External links
 
 Magyar Életrajzi Lexikon

1852 births
1937 deaths
19th-century Hungarian people
20th-century Hungarian people
Education ministers of Hungary
Speakers of the House of Magnates
Hungarian nobility
People from Zalaegerszeg